Heredity is a 1985 album by Rational Youth, now down to singer Tracy Howe with numerous studio musicians. In retrospect, Howe was less than happy with the album, especially with the fact that it looked like he was using the Rational Youth name as a flag of convenience for a solo album.  The use of the Rational Youth name was suggested by Capitol Records, to which Howe acquiesced.  The album, while successful, appealed to a different audience than earlier Rational Youth fans, confusing the latter. To date, the album has never seen a CD release.

Heredity was produced by Howe together with former Klaatu member Dee Long.

Track listing
"Heredity" (Tracy Howe, Peter McGee) - 4:15
"No More And No Less" (Howe) - 4:05
"Call Me" (Howe) - 2:58
"In Your Eyes" (Howe, Kevin Komoda) - 3:10
"I've Got A Sister In The Navy" (Howe) - 3:42
"Bang On" (* John Jones) - 4:10
"Freeze" (Howe, McGee) - 5:01
"Burn The Night Away" (Howe) - 3:20
"Holiday In Bangkok" (Howe) - 5:20
"Sorry" (Howe) - 4:48

Tracks 4 and 9 have previously appeared on the Rational Youth EP. "Holiday in Bangkok" is basically the same version with overdubs, while "In Your Eyes" is a re-recording.

Personnel
 Tracy Howe - vocals, keyboards, guitars
 Dee Long - guitars, keyboards, Fairlight CMI programming
 Ken "Spider" Sinnaeve - bass guitar
 David Quinton - drums and percussion
 Peter McGee - guitars, keyboards, backing vocals
 Gary Boigon - alto and tenor saxophones
 Ben Mink - violin, mandolin
 Joel Zifkin - violin
 Karen Hendrix - backing vocals
 David Roberts - backing vocals
 John Jones - backing vocals, additional keyboards, Fairlight CMI programming
 Gordon Adamson - backing vocals
 Steve Jensen - additional guitars
 Carl Harvey - additional guitars, synth guitar
 Roman Martyn - additional guitars
 Paul "Slowhand" Northfield - additional keyboards
 Bill Vorn - additional keyboards
 Kevin Komoda - additional keyboards
 Daniel Lussier - additional keyboards
 Rick Joudrey - bass
 Recorded & Mixed at ESP Studios, Buttonville, Ontario & AIR Studio, London, UK

References

1985 albums
Rational Youth albums